Ladeana Hillier is a biomedical engineer and computational biologist. She was one of the earliest scientists involved in the Human Genome Project and is noted for her work in various branches of DNA sequencing, as well as for having co-developed Phred, a widely used DNA trace analyzer.

See also
Phred base calling

References

External links
 

American bioinformaticians
Human Genome Project scientists
Living people
Year of birth missing (living people)
Washington University in St. Louis faculty